Srikanta Acharya is a Kolkata-based modern Bengali singer . Acharya is one of the most prominent exponents of Rabindra Sangeet.

Early life
Srikanta Acharya was born in Kolkata, India and is the son of Rohini Nandan Acharya and Kana Acharya. He received formal training in Rabindrasangeet from Dakshinee. He also received training in tabla from Ustad Ali Ahmed Khan. He quit his job as a sales professional and then Utpal Chakravarty, proprietor of an old music store, convinced him to send his cassettes to Sagarika Music.

Music career 
He is a qualitative songs-tan of Bengal music.
He made many music albums which contains various types of Bangla songs...'ak jhank pakhi' is one of the popular albums of Srikanta Acharya.

Awards

Discography

Bengali albums 
Ek Jhank Pakhi (1998, Sagarika)

Swapno Dekhao Tumi (1999, Sagarika)

Brishti Tomake Dilam (2000, Sagarika )

Nadir Chhobi Aanki (2001, Sagarika)

Mone Pore (2002, Sagarika)

Sudhu Valo Theko (2003, Atlantis Music)

Kachhei Achhi (2003, Sagarika)

Ghuri (2004, Sagarika)

Sonar Meye (2005, Prime Music)

Roddur (2006, Sa Re Ga Ma)

Aami Noi (2008, Srikanta Acharya Productions)

Ghum Nei Raat (2008, Saregama, with Kavita Krishnamurty, Rupankar)

Musafirana (2011, Orion Entertainment)

Musafirana 2 (2016, Srikanta Acharya Productions)

Rabindrasangeet albums 
Hey Bandhu Hey Priyo (1996, Sagarika)

Anubhabe Jenechhilem (1997, Sagarika)

Nivrito Praner Debota (1998, Sagarika )

Nirabo Nirjane (1999, Sagarika)

Prem Esechhilo (2000, Sagarika)

Hridoy Aamar (2001, Sagarika)

Roudro Chhayay (2002, Sagarika)

Pather Dhare (2006, Bhavna Records)

Chirosakha (2009, Sagarika)

Bajao Tumi Kabi (2010, T-Series)

Anek Diner Gaan (2014, Picasso Entertainment)

Ei Niralai (2014, Bhavna Records)

Rabindrasangeet Duet albums 
Valobasi (2001, Sagarika, With Sriradha Bandyopadhyay)

Milechho Mor Prane (2002, Sagarika, With Lopamudra Mitra)

Rabindrasangeet Other albums 
Aapon Gaan, Vol – 1 (2000, Bhavana, With Soumitra Chatterjee)

Aapon Gaan, Vol – 2 (Bhavana, With Soumitra Chatterjee)

Chitrangada (2002, Sagarika, Geeti Natya)

Pather Sathi (2003, Sagarika, With Dr. Rajib Chakraborty)

Uttaran (2011, Srikanta Acharya Productions, With Sraboni Sen & Ratna Mitra)

Cover albums 
Moner Janala (1996, Sagarika)

Neel Dhrubatara (1997, Sagarika)

Kono Ekdin (1998, Sagarika)

Uttaradhikar  (2003, Sagarika)

Cover Duet albums 
Sudhu Dujone  (1998, Sagarika, With Sadhana Sargam)

Enkechi Dujone  (1999, Sagarika, With Sadhana Sargam)

Devotional albums 
Ma Aamar (1999, Sagarika)

Sri Sri Ramkrishnayan (2000, Sagarika)

Sadhananjali (2001, Sagarika)

Amar Prem (1998, Sagarika)

Offering (2001, Rhyme Records)

Films

Awards
 Outstanding Young Person's Award for his achievements in Music awarded by the North Calcutta Junior Chamber

2000
 Anandabazar Award for Best Puja Album of the Year - Brishti Tomake Dilam

2001
 Anandabazar Award for Best Puja Album of the Year - Nodir Chhobi Anki
 Anandalok Award for Best Male Vocal - Nodir Chhobi Anki

2003
 Anandalok Award: Best Male Playback Singer - "Momo Chitte Niti Nritye" in Aamar Bhuvan
 Bengal Film Journalists' Association - Best Male Playback Award - "Megh Pion-er Bag-er Bhitor" in Titli

2004
 Anandabazar Award for Best Puja Album of the Year - Ghuri
 Alpha Music Award for Best Rabindrasangeet Album - Jibon Chhobi

2006
 Anandabazar Award for Best Puja Album of the Year - Roddur

See also 
 Prabhat Samgiita

References

External links
 

Bengali singers
Indian male singer-songwriters
Indian singer-songwriters
Living people
Singers from Kolkata
Year of birth missing (living people)